Pacu is the common name of several South American fishes. Pacu may also refer to:

People
Jovan Paču (1847–1902), Serbian composer and pianist
Lazar Paču (1855–1915), Serbian doctor and politician

Rivers
Pacu River (Amajari River tributary), in northern Brazil
Pacu River (Catrimani River tributary), in northern Brazil
Pacu River (Pará), in north-central Brazil

Other
Pacu Jalur, a rowing race held annually in Indonesia
Pacu jawi, a traditional bull race in Indonesia
Post-anesthesia care unit (PACU), a recovery area found in many medical facilities

See also

Paku (disambiguation)